Kurt Oberhöller (born 27 January 1950) is an Austrian bobsledder. He competed at the 1976 Winter Olympics and the 1980 Winter Olympics.

References

1950 births
Living people
Austrian male bobsledders
Olympic bobsledders of Austria
Bobsledders at the 1976 Winter Olympics
Bobsledders at the 1980 Winter Olympics
Sportspeople from Innsbruck